These are the results for the boys' 10m platform event at the 2018 Summer Youth Olympics.

Results

References

Preliminary Results 
Final Results 

Diving at the 2018 Summer Youth Olympics